This page is a list of auditing topics.

A
Audit

C
Control risk
-Correctness
-Cut-off

D
Detection risk
-Due diligence
-Engagement letter

E
Existence
-External audit
-External auditor

E
Financial statement assertions

F
Fraud deterrence

G
Going concern

I
Inherent risk
-Internal audit
-Internal auditor
-Internal control
-International Federation of Accountants
-International Standards on Auditing

M
Management representations

R
Risk assessment

S
Sampling risk
-Stocktaking

Auditing topics
Auditing
Auditing